The Sentimental Chord is the fourth Korean studio album by SG Wannabe. Again, they amazed the audience with their new title song "Arirang" ("아리랑"), which had the classic instruments of Korea playing as the background music. With the release of their 4th album and their title song, they went as the #1 in the Bugs Chart as well as the Korea monthly chart.  The album was also number one on the "Top 20 Album Sales (May 2007)" with 44,618 copies sold in May and 125,450 sold altogether. So far, the album has sold 199,319 copies including both CD and digital disc sales.

Towards the end of the year, SG Wannabe was awarded their second Daesang from the Golden Disk Awards, reigning as the top artist of the year.  Selling almost 200,000 copies, The Sentimental Chord was the best-selling album of 2007 in Korea.

Music videos
The music video for "Arirang" featured Lee Beom-soo, Ock Joo-hyun, and Lee Sun-kyun. The storyline was set around the Korean War in the 1950s.

The music video for "Stay" featured Ha Seok-jin and Shin Min-hee.

Track listing

Awards and achievements
2007: Daesang (Golden Disk Awards)

References

SG Wannabe albums
Stone Music Entertainment albums
2007 albums
Grand Prize Golden Disc Award-winning albums